Dayne Kelly (born 23 July 1990) is an Australian tennis player playing on the ATP Challenger Tour. On 18 September 2017, he reached his highest ATP singles ranking of 252.

Challenger and Futures/World Tennis Tour Finals

Singles: 26 (15-11)

Doubles

External links 
 
 

1990 births
Living people
Australian male tennis players
Place of birth missing (living people)